Aidan Thomas Cummins (born 22 May 1979) is an Irish hurler who played as a left wing-back for the Kilkenny senior team.

Cummins joined the team during the 2000 championship and was a regular member of the team until his retirement from inter-county hurling after four seasons. During that time he won three All-Ireland winners' medals as a non-playing substitute and one National Hurling League winners' medal on the field of play.

At club level Cummins is a three-time All-Ireland medalist with Ballyhale Shamrocks. In addition to this he has also won four Leinster winners' medals and six championship medals.

References

1979 births
Living people
Ballyhale Shamrocks hurlers
Kilkenny inter-county hurlers
Hurling selectors